Green Bank is a census-designated place in Pocahontas County in West Virginia's Potomac Highlands inside the Allegheny Mountain Range. Green Bank is located along WV 28. Green Bank is home to the Green Bank Observatory and is also close to the Snowshoe Mountain ski resort. As of the 2020 census, its population was 141.

The community was named for a green riverbank near the original town site.

National Radio Quiet Zone
Green Bank is located within the National Radio Quiet Zone, which means that radio transmissions are heavily restricted by law. This policy is enforced by a "radio policeman" who uses specialized equipment to detect signals from unauthorized electronics. Green Bank is home to the Green Bank Telescope, the world's largest fully steerable radio telescope, which was operated by the National Radio Astronomy Observatory (NRAO) until September 30, 2016. Since October 1, 2016, the Telescope has been operated by the Green Bank Observatory, which is no longer part of the NRAO. It was at the Green Bank Site in 1961 that Frank Drake presented the Drake Equation, which was developed to provide an estimate of the total number of detectable extraterrestrial civilizations in the Milky Way galaxy.

As Green Bank is located within the National Radio Quiet Zone many people who believe they suffer from electromagnetic hypersensitivity are finding new homes within its borders. Escape from cellular radiation is the main attraction to Green Bank for these people. , around 30 people had moved to Green Bank to escape the detrimental effects of electromagnetic hypersensitivity.

Notable person
 Bruce Bosley, a four-time All-Pro for the San Francisco 49ers and a standout player at West Virginia in the 1950s, starred as running back at the now-closed and demolished Green Bank High School.

References

External links 
 Gaynor, Michael J. "The Town Without Wi-Fi," Washingtonian (January 2015).
 Kennedy, Pagan. "Opinion: The Land Where the Internet Ends: To find real solitude, you have to go out of range. But every year that’s harder to do, as America’s off-the-grid places disappear," New York Times (June 21, 2019)
 Frazier, Kylie "Broadband Comes To Rural America, But How Many Will Use It?" Internet Providers by Zip News (August 18, 2014)

Census-designated places in Pocahontas County, West Virginia
Census-designated places in West Virginia